NanoNed is the Nanotechnology Research and Development initiative of Dutch Government. It is financed Ministry of Economic Affairs (Netherlands).Dutch Technology Foundation STW is responsible for the program management of NanoNed . It is a consortium of seven universities, TNO and Philips. University of Leiden, University of Utrecht and FOM institute AMOLF in Amsterdam are also the partners of NanoNed . Around 400 researchers are working within all these partners. On the basis of National Research and Development strength and industrial needs, 11 interdependent program has developed and named as "Flagship". Each of these flagships is led by a "Flagship Captain". In 2009, more than 400 researchers are working in different 200 projects.

NanoNed also established its first foreign office in Japan (NanoNed Japan Office), led by Prof. Wilfred Van Der Wiel .

Flagship

Advanced NanoProbing 
BioNanoSystems 
Bottom-up Nano-Electronics 
Chemistry and Physics of Individual Molecules 
Nano Electronic Materials 
NanoFabrication 
Nanofluidics 
NanoInstrumentation 
NanoPhotonics 
Nano-Spintronics 
Quantum Computing

Consortium Partners
MESA+ Institute for Nanotechnology, University of Twente
Kavli Institute of Nanoscience, Delft University of Technology
Centre for Nano Materials, Eindhoven University of Technology
BioMaDe, University of Groningen
Institute for Molecules and Materials, Radboud University Nijmegen
BioNT, Wageningen University and Research Centre
HIMS, University of Amsterdam
TNO Science and Industry
Philips Electronics Nederland

Co-operation partners

AMOLF
Leiden University
Utrecht University

See also

MESA+ Institute for Nanotechnology
List of nanotechnology organizations

External links
 NanoNed
 Ministry of Economic Affairs
 Dutch Technology Foundation STW

References 

1. NanoNed, Retrieved on December 13, 2009
2. NanoNed Section of Dutch Technology Foundation, Retrieved on December 13, 2009
3. The gateway to Dutch scientific information NARCIS, Retrieved on December 13, 2009
4. NanoNed Foreign Office, Retrieved on December 13, 2009

Nanotechnology institutions